The 32nd Biathlon World Championships were held in 1997 in Brezno-Osrblie, Slovakia. The pursuit races were contested for the first time in the world championships.

Men's results

20 km individual

10 km sprint

12.5 km pursuit

Team event

4 × 7.5 km relay

Women's results

15 km individual

7.5 km sprint

10 km pursuit

Team event

4 × 7.5 km relay

Medal table

References

External links
Swedish Magdalena Forsberg celebrated in Sundsvall after rturning home from the event, SVT's open archive 

1997
Biathlon World Championships
International sports competitions hosted by Slovakia
1997 in Slovak sport
February 1997 sports events in Europe
Biathlon competitions in Slovakia